Anne Pincus  (born Melbourne, 1961) is an Australian painter and sculptor. She currently lives in Munich, Germany.

Pincus studied Visual Art at the Monash University, Gippsland campus from 1978 to 1983. Her Graduate Diploma in Religious Education from the La Trobe University, she received in 1992. In 1994 she moved to Germany. She participated in many group and solo exhibitions.

Solo exhibitions 
 1984: "Recent Works", The Gallery, Akaroa, New Zealand
 1993:
 "Recent Paintings", Melbourne Contemporary Art Gallery, Melbourne
 "Shadow Stories", Access Contemporary Art Gallery, Sydney
 1997: "Malerei", Café Gap, Munich
 1998: "ask the dust", Access Contemporary Art Gallery, Sydney
 1999: "Ölgemälde", Jazzclub Unterfahrt, Munich
 2000: "Distillations", Access Contemporary Art Gallery, Sydney
 2001: European Patent Office, Munich
 2003: "Transcience" (installation), St. Rupert's Church, Munich
 2004:
 "of the body and other strange phenomena", 84 GHz, Munich
 "in der Schwebe" (installation), Church of the Resurrection (Auferstehungskirche), Munich
 2006: "Parachute love" (installation), St. Benedict's Church, Munich
 2009: "the latitude of shadows", Galerie Kaysser, Munich
 2010: "swimming with medusa", werkschau. galerie für objekte + bilder, Munich

External links

References 

Australian painters
20th-century Australian sculptors
Monash University alumni
La Trobe University alumni
Artists from Melbourne
1961 births
Living people
Australian women painters
21st-century Australian sculptors
Australian women sculptors
20th-century Australian women artists
21st-century Australian women artists